Paul Celan (23 November 1920 – c. 20 April 1970) was a Romanian-born German-language poet and translator. He was born as Paul Antschel to a Jewish family in Cernăuți (German: Czernowitz), in the then Kingdom of Romania (now Chernivtsi, Ukraine), and adopted the pseudonym "Paul Celan". He became one of the major German-language poets of the post-World War II era.

Life

Early life
Celan was born into a German-speaking Jewish family in Cernăuți, Bukovina, a region then part of Romania and earlier part of the Austro-Hungarian Empire (when his birthplace was known as Czernowitz). His first home was in the Wassilkogasse in Cernăuți. His father, Leo Antschel, was a Zionist who advocated his son's education in Hebrew at the Jewish school Safah Ivriah (meaning the Hebrew language).

Celan's mother, Fritzi, was an avid reader of German literature who insisted German be the language of the house. In his teens Celan became active in Jewish Socialist organizations and fostered support for the Republican cause in the Spanish Civil War. His earliest known poem is titled Mother's Day 1938.

Paul attended the Liceul Ortodox de Băieți No. 1 (Boys' Orthodox Secondary School No. 1) from 1930 until 1935, Liceul de Băieți No. 2 în Cernăuți (Boys' Secondary School No. 2 in Cernăuți) from 1935 to 1936, followed by the Liceul Marele Voievod Mihai (Great Prince Mihai Preparatory School, now Chernivtsi School No. 5), where he studied from 1936 until graduating in 1938. At this time Celan secretly began to write poetry.

In 1938 Celan traveled to Tours, France, to study medicine. The Anschluss precluded his study in Vienna, and Romanian schools were harder to get into due to the newly imposed Jewish quota. His journey to France took him through Berlin as the events of Kristallnacht unfolded, and also introduced him to his uncle, Bruno Schrager, who was later among the French detainees murdered at Birkenau. Celan returned to Cernăuţi in 1939 to study literature and Romance languages.

Life during World War II
Following the Soviet occupation of Bukovina in June 1940, deportations to Siberia started. A year later, following the reconquest by Romania, Nazi Germany and the then-fascist Romanian regime brought ghettos, internment, and forced labour (see Romania in World War II).

On arrival in Cernăuți in July 1941, the German SS Einsatzkommando and their Romanian allies set the city's Great Synagogue on fire. In October, the Romanians deported a large number of Jews after forcing them into a ghetto, where Celan translated Shakespeare's sonnets and continued to write his own poetry. Before the ghetto was dissolved in the fall of that year, Celan was pressed into labor, first clearing the debris of a demolished post office, and then gathering and destroying Russian books.

The local mayor, Traian Popovici, strove to mitigate the harsh circumstances, until the governor of Bukovina had the Jews rounded up and deported, starting on a Saturday night in June 1942. Celan hoped to convince his parents to leave the country so as to escape certain persecution. While Celan was away from home, on 21 June 1942, his parents were taken from their home and sent by train to an internment camp in Transnistria Governorate, where two-thirds of the deportees eventually perished. Celan's father likely perished of typhus and his mother was shot after being exhausted by forced labour. Later that year, after being taken to a labour camp in Romania, Celan would receive reports of his parents' deaths.

Celan remained imprisoned in a work-camp until February 1944, when the Red Army's advance forced the Romanians to abandon the camps, whereupon he returned to Cernăuţi shortly before the Soviets returned. There, he worked briefly as a nurse in the mental hospital. Friends from this period recall Celan expressing immense guilt over his separation from his parents, whom he had tried to convince to go into hiding prior to the deportations, shortly before their deaths.

Life after the war
Considering emigration to Palestine, Celan left Cernăuţi in 1945 for Bucharest, where he remained until 1947. He was active in the Jewish literary community as both a translator of Russian literature into Romanian, and as a poet, publishing his work under a variety of pseudonyms. The literary scene of the time was richly populated with surrealists – Gellu Naum, Ilarie Voronca, Gherasim Luca, Paul Păun, and Dolfi Trostand it was in this period that Celan developed pseudonyms both for himself and his friends, including the one he took as his pen name.

A version of Celan's poem "Todesfuge" appeared as "" ("Death Tango") in a Romanian translation of May 1947. Additional remarks were published explaining that the dancing and musical performances evoked in the poem were images of realities of the extermination camp life.

Emigration and Paris years
On the emergence of the communist regime in Romania, Celan fled Romania for Vienna, Austria. It was there that he befriended Ingeborg Bachmann, who had just completed a dissertation on Martin Heidegger. Facing a city divided between occupying powers and with little resemblance to the mythic capital it once was, which had harboured the (now) shattered Austro-Hungarian Jewish community, he moved to Paris in 1948. In that year his first poetry collection, Der Sand aus den Urnen ("Sand from the Urns"), was published in Vienna by A. Sexl. His first few years in Paris were marked by intense feelings of loneliness and isolation, as expressed in letters to his colleagues, including his longtime friend from Cernăuţi, Petre Solomon. It was also during this time that he exchanged many letters with Diet Kloos, a young Dutch singer and anti-Nazi resister who saw her husband of a few months tortured to death. She visited Celan twice in Paris between 1949 and 1951.

In 1952, Celan's writing began to gain recognition when he read his poetry on his first reading trip to Germany where he was invited to read at the semiannual meetings of Group 47. At their May meeting he read his poem Todesfuge ("Death Fugue"), a depiction of concentration camp life. When Ingeborg Bachmann, with whom Celan had an affair, won the group's prize for her collection  (The Extended Hours), Celan (whose work had received only six votes) said "After the meeting, only six people remembered my name". He did not attend any other meeting of the group.

In November 1951, he met the graphic artist Gisèle Lestrange, in Paris. He sent her many love letters, influenced by Franz Kafka's correspondence with Milena Jesenská and Felice Bauer. They married on 21 December 1952, despite the opposition of her aristocratic family. During the following 18 years they wrote over 700 letters; amongst the active correspondents of Celan were Hermann Lenz and his wife, Hanne. He made his living as a translator and lecturer in German at the École normale supérieure. He was a close friend of Nelly Sachs, who later won the Nobel Prize for literature.

Celan became a French citizen in 1955 and lived in Paris. Celan's sense of persecution increased after the widow of a friend, the French-German poet Yvan Goll, unjustly accused him of having plagiarised her husband's work. Celan was awarded the Bremen Literature Prize in 1958 and the Georg Büchner Prize in 1960.

Celan drowned himself in the river Seine in Paris around 20 April 1970.

Poetry and poetics
The death of his parents and the experience of the Shoah (The Holocaust) are defining forces in Celan's poetry and his use of language. In his Bremen Prize speech, Celan said of language after Auschwitz that:

Celan also said: "There is nothing in the world for which a poet will give up writing, not even when he is a Jew and the language of his poems is German."

The characters of Margarete and Sulamith, with their respectively golden and ashen hair, can be interpreted as a reflection of Celan's Jewish-German culture, while the blue-eyed "Master from Germany" embodies German Nazism.

In later years his poetry became progressively more cryptic, fractured and monosyllabic, bearing comparison to the music of Anton Webern. He also increased his use of German neologisms, especially in his later works Fadensonnen ("Threadsuns") and Lichtzwang. In the eyes of some, Celan attempted in his poetry either to destroy or remake the German language. For others, he retained a sense for the lyricism of the German language which was rare in writers of that time. As he writes in a letter to his wife Gisèle Lestrange on one of his trips to Germany: "The German I talk is not the same as the language the German people are talking here". Writing in German was a way for him to think back and remember his parents, particularly his mother, from whom he had learned the language. This is underlined in "" (Lupin), a poem in which Paul Celan addresses his mother. The urgency and power of Celan's work stem from his attempt to find words "after", to bear (impossible) witness in a language that gives back no words "for that which happened".

In addition to writing poetry (in German and, earlier, in Romanian), he was an extremely active translator and polyglot, translating literature from Romanian, French, Spanish, Portuguese, Italian, Russian, Hebrew, and English into German.

Awards
 Bremen Literature Prize 1958
 Georg Büchner Prize 1960

Significance 
Based on the reception of his work, it could be suggested that Celan, along with Goethe, Hölderlin and Rilke, is one of the most significant German poets who ever lived. Despite the difficulty of his work, his poetry is thoroughly researched, the total number of scholarly papers numbering in the thousands. Many contemporary philosophers, including Maurice Blanchot, Jacques Derrida, Hans-Georg Gadamer and others have devoted at least one of their books to his writing.

Bibliography

In German
 Der Sand aus den Urnen (The Sand from the Urns, 1948)
 Mohn und Gedächtnis (Poppy and Memory, 1952)
 Von Schwelle zu Schwelle (From Threshold to Threshold, 1955)
 Sprachgitter (Speechwicket / Speech Grille, 1959)
 Die Niemandsrose (The No-One's-Rose, 1963)
 Atemwende (Breathturn, 1967)
 Fadensonnen (Threadsuns / Twinesuns / Fathomsuns, 1968)
 Lichtzwang (Lightduress / Light-Compulsion, 1970)
 Schneepart (Snow Part [posthumous], 1971)
 Zeitgehöft (Timestead / Homestead of Time [posthumous], 1976)

Translations

Celan's poetry has been translated into English, with many of the volumes being bilingual. The most comprehensive collections are from John Felstiner, Pierre Joris, and Michael Hamburger, who revised his translations of Celan over a period of two decades. Susan H. Gillespie and Ian Fairley have released English translations.

Joris has also translated Celan's German poems into French:
 "Speech-Grille" and Selected Poems, translated by Joachim Neugroschel (1971)
 Nineteen Poems by Paul Celan, translated by Michael Hamburger (1972)
 Paul Celan, 65 Poems, translated by Brian Lynch and Peter Jankowsky (1985)
 Last Poems, translated by Katharine Washburn and Margret Guillemin (1986)
 Collected Prose, edited by Rosmarie Waldrop (1986) 
 Atemwende/Breathturn, translated by Pierre Joris (1995)
 Paul Celan, Nelly Sachs: Correspondence, translated by Christopher Clark, edited with an introduction by John Felstiner (1998)
 Glottal Stop: 101 Poems, translated by Nikolai B. Popov and Heather McHugh (2000) (winner of the 2001 International Griffin Poetry Prize)
 
 Poems of Paul Celan: A Bilingual German/English Edition, Revised Edition, translated by Michael Hamburger (2001)
 Fathomsuns/Fadensonnen and Benighted/Eingedunkelt, translated by Ian Fairley (2001)
 Paul Celan: Selections, edited and with an introduction by Pierre Joris (2005)
 Lichtzwang/Lightduress, translated and with an introduction by Pierre Joris, a bilingual edition (Green Integer, 2005)
 Snow Part, translated by Ian Fairley (2007)
 From Threshold to Threshold, translated by David Young (2010)
 Paul Celan, Ingeborg Bachmann: Correspondence, translated by Wieland Hoban (2010)
 The Correspondence of Paul Celan and Ilana Shmueli, translated by Susan H. Gillespie with a preface by John Felstiner (2011)
 The Meridian: Final Version – Drafts – Materials, edited by Bernhard Böschenstein and Heino Schmull, translated by Pierre Joris (2011)
 Corona: Selected Poems of Paul Celan, translated by Susan H. Gillespie (Station Hill of Barrytown, 2013)
Breathturn into Timestead: The Collected Later Poetry: A Bilingual Edition, translated by Pierre Joris (2015)
 Something is still present and isn't, of what's gone. A bilingual anthology of avant-garde and avant-garde inspired Rumanian poetry, (translated by Victor Pambuccian), Aracne editrice, Rome, 2018.
Microliths They Are, Little Stones: Posthumous Prose, translated by Pierre Joris (2020)
Memory Rose Into Threshold Speech: The Collected Earlier Poetry, A Bilingual Edition, translated by Pierre Joris (2020)

In Romanian
 , Andrei Corbea Hoişie

Bilingual
 Paul Celan. /, editor Andrei Corbea Hoişie
 Schneepart / Snøpart. Translated 2012 to Norwegian by Anders Bærheim and Cornelia Simon

Writers translated by Celan

 Guillaume Apollinaire
 Tudor Arghezi
 Antonin Artaud
 Charles Baudelaire
 Alexander Blok
 André Breton
 Jean Cayrol
 Aimé Césaire
 René Char
 Emil Cioran
 Jean Daive
 Robert Desnos
 Emily Dickinson
 John Donne
 André du Bouchet
 Jacques Dupin
 Paul Éluard
 Robert Frost
 Clement Greenberg
 A. E. Housman
 Velimir Khlebnikov
 Maurice Maeterlinck
 Stéphane Mallarmé
 Osip Mandelstam
 Andrew Marvell
 Henri Michaux
 Marianne Moore
 Gellu Naum
 Gérard de Nerval
 
 Benjamin Péret
 Fernando Pessoa
 Pablo Picasso
 Arthur Rimbaud
 
 William Shakespeare
 Georges Simenon
 Jules Supervielle
 
 Giuseppe Ungaretti
 Paul Valéry
 Sergei Yesenin
 Yevgeny Yevtushenko

About translations
About translating David Rokeah from Hebrew, Celan wrote: "David Rokeah was here for two days, I have translated two poems for him, mediocre stuff, and given him comments on other German translation, suggested improvements ... I was glad, probably in the wrong place, to be able to decipher and translate a Hebrew text."

Biographies
 Paul Celan: A Biography of His Youth Israel Chalfen, intro. John Felstiner, trans. Maximilian Bleyleben (New York: Persea Books, 1991)
 Paul Celan: Poet, Survivor, Jew, John Felstiner (Yale University Press, 1995)

Selected criticism
 Word Traces, Aris Fioretos (ed.), includes contributions by Jacques Derrida, Werner Hamacher, and Philippe Lacoue-Labarthe (1994)
 Gadamer on Celan: 'Who Am I and Who Are You?' and Other Essays, Hans-Georg Gadamer (trans.) and Richard Heinemann and Bruce Krajewski (eds.) (1997)
 Poetry as Experience Philippe Lacoue-Labarthe, Andrea Tarnowski (trans.) (1999)
 Economy of the Unlost: Reading Simonides of Keos with Paul Celan, Carson, Anne. Princeton: Princeton University Press (1999)
 Zur Poetik Paul Celans: Gedicht und Mensch - die Arbeit am Sinn, Marko Pajević. Universitätsverlag C. Winter, Heidelberg (2000).
 Poésie contre poésie. Celan et la littérature, Jean Bollack. PUF (2001)
 Celan Studies Péter Szondi; Susan Bernofsky and Harvey Mendelsohn (trans.) (2003)
 L'écrit : une poétique dans l'oeuvre de Celan, Jean Bollack. PUF (2003)
 Paul Celan et Martin Heidegger: le sens d'un dialogue, Hadrien France-Lanord (2004)
 Words from Abroad: Trauma and Displacement in Postwar German Jewish Writers, Katja Garloff (2005)
 Sovereignties in Question: the Poetics of Paul Celan, Jacques Derrida (trans.), Thomas Dutoit and Outi Pasanen (eds.), a collection of mostly late works, including "Rams," which is also a memorial essay on Gadamer and his Who Am I and Who Are You?, and a new translation of Schibboleth (2005)
 Paul Celan and Martin Heidegger: An Unresolved Conversation, 1951–1970, James K. Lyon (2006)
 Anselm Kiefer /Paul Celan. Myth, Mourning and Memory, Andréa Lauterwein. With 157 illustrations, 140 in colour. Thames & Hudson, London.  (2007)
 Sites of the Uncanny: Paul Celan, Specularity and the Visual Arts, Eric Kligerman.  Berlin and New York (Interdisciplinary German Cultural Studies, 3) (2007)
 Vor Morgen. Bachmann und Celan. Die Minne im Angesicht der Morde. Arnau Pons in Kultur & Genspenster. Heft Nr. 10. (2010)
 Das Gesicht des Gerechten. Paul Celan besucht Friedrich Dürrenmatt,  Werner Wögerbauer in Kultur & Genspenster. Heft Nr. 10.  (2010) 
 Poetry as Individuality: The Discourse of Observation in Paul Celan, Derek Hillard. Bucknell University Press. (2010)
 Vor Morgen. Bachmann und Celan. Die Minne im Angesicht der Morde, Arnau Pons in Kultur & Genspenster. Heft Nr. 10. (2010)
 Still Songs: Music In and Around the Poetry of Paul Celan, Axel Englund. Farnham: Ashgate. (2012)
 Shakespeare and Celan: A very brief comparative Study,  Pinaki Roy in Yearly Shakespeare (ISSN 0976-9536) (xviii): 118-24. (2020)

Audio-visual

Recordings
 , readings of his original compositions
 , readings of his translations of Osip Mandelstam and Sergei Yesenin
 Six Celan Songs, texts of his poems , sung by Ute Lemper, set to music by Michael Nyman
 "" (from ), "Zähle die Mandeln" (from ), "Psalm" (from ), set to music by Giya Kancheli as parts II–IV of Exil, sung by Maacha Deubner, ECM (1995)
 Pulse Shadows by Harrison Birtwistle; nine settings of poems by Celan, interleaved with nine pieces for string quartet (one of which is an instrumental setting of "Todesfuge").

Reviews
Dove, Richard (1981), Mindus Inversus, review of Selected Poems translated by Michael Humburger. in Murray, Glen (ed.), Cencrastus No. 7, Winter 1981-82, p. 48,

Further reading
John Felstiner "Writing Zion" Paul Celan and Yehuda Amichai: An Exchange between Two Great Poets, The New Republic, 5 June 2006
John Felstiner, "Paul Celan and Yehuda Amichai: An Exchange between Two Great Poets", Midstream, vol. 53, no. 1 (Jan.–Feb. 2007)
Daive, Jean. Under The Dome: Walks with Paul Celan (tr. Rosmarie Waldrop), Providence, Rhode Island: Burning Deck, 2009.
Mario Kopić: "Amfiteater v Freiburgu, julija 1967", Arendt, Heidegger, Celan, Apokalipsa, 153–154, 2011 (Slovenian)
Hana Amichai: "The leap between the yet and the not any more",  Yehuda Amichai and Paul Celan, Haaretz, 6 April 2012 (Hebrew)
Aquilina, Mario, The Event of Style in Literature (Palgrave Macmillan, 2014)
Daive, Jean. Albiach / Celan (author, tr. Donald Wellman), Anne-Marie Albiach (author), (tr. Julian Kabza), Ann Arbor, Michigan: Annex Press, 2017.

External links

Selected Celan exhibits, sites, homepages on the web
  Link to the new site
 Biography of Celan at the George Mason University site
 Overview at Littlebluelight.com
 Limited-edition of Paul Celan's reading before the German literary club, Group 47, from The Shackman Press
 Spike Magazine's analysis on the writing of Celan
 Against Time: Essays on Paul Celan on Point and Circumference

Selected poetry, poems, poetics on the web (English translations of Celan)
 "Die Zweite Bibliographie", Jerry Glenn (copious bibliography, through 1995, in German)
 Recent Celan essays by John Felstiner: 1) "Paul Celan Meets Samuel Beckett", American Poetry Review, July/August 2004 & poetrydaily.org, 6 July 2004; 2) "Writing Zion: An Exchange between Celan and Amichai", New Republic, 12 June 2006 & "Paul Celan and Yehuda Amichai: An Exchange on Nation and Exile", wordswithoutborders.org; 3) "The One and Only Circle: Paul Celan's Letters to Gisèle", Fiction 54, 2008 and (expanded ) Mantis, 2009
 Celan on Mandelstam: extracts from the variorum edition of the Meridian speech featured on Pierre Joris's blog, this is a page of notes, fragments, sketches for sentences, etc., Celan took when preparing a radio-essay on Osip Mandelstam. However, as Joris points out: "some of the thinking reappears, transformed, in the Meridian".
 "Four New Translations of Paul Celan", by Ian Fairley in Guernica Magazine
 "Fugue of Death" (English translation of "")
 "Death Fugue" (Another English translation of "")
 InstaPLANET Cultural Universe: three poems from Die Gedichte aus dem Nachlass in the original German with a translation into English by Ana Elsner
 "Dissertation on the French Reception of Celan"
 Ring-Narrowing Day Under, one of seven poems translated from the German by Heather McHugh and Nikolai Popov, originally published in Jubilat
 Extract from Lightduress (Cycle 6), translated by Pierre Joris; originally published by Samizdat
 Dan Kaufman & Barbez music recorded an album based upon the life and poems of Paul Celan, published on the Tzadik label in the series of Radical Jewish Culture.
 translations from ATEMWENDE/ Breathturn Cal Kinnear translates Paul Celan
Selected multimedia presentations
 Recordings of Celan reading a selection of his poems, including "", with translations by John Felstiner
 Griffin Poetry Prize reading by Nikolai Popov and Heather McHugh from Glottal Stop: 101 Poems by Paul Celan, including video clip

References

1920 births
1970 suicides
Writers from Chernivtsi
Academic staff of the École Normale Supérieure
German-language poets
Jewish poets
French people of Romanian-Jewish descent
Romanian emigrants to France
Jewish Romanian writers
Bukovina Jews
Romanian male poets
French male poets
Romanian translators
Romanian writers in French
Romanian writers in German
French writers in German
Suicides by drowning in France
Georg Büchner Prize winners
Nazi-era ghetto inmates
Jewish concentration camp survivors
20th-century French translators
20th-century Romanian poets
20th-century French poets
Translators of William Shakespeare
French male dramatists and playwrights
Forced labourers under German rule during World War II